Georgia Moore is an Australian ice hockey defender. She was the first player from Australia to be selected in the CWHL draft, being drafted 61st overall by the Calgary Inferno in 2013.

She has won the Joan McKowen Memorial Trophy twice with Melbourne. She has also played Canadian football in the Western Women's Canadian Football League, and has represented Australia in inline hockey.

References

External links
 Biographical information and career statistics from Elite Prospects

1987 births
Living people
Australian ice hockey players
Australian sportswomen
Australian expatriate sportspeople in Canada
Expatriate ice hockey players in Canada
Sportswomen from Victoria (Australia)
Australian players of Canadian football
Inline hockey players